René Schneider (born 20 April 1938) is a Luxembourgian footballer. He played in 29 matches for the Luxembourg national football team from 1959 to 1966.

References

External links
 

1938 births
Living people
Luxembourgian footballers
Luxembourg international footballers
Place of birth missing (living people)
Association footballers not categorized by position